Stele, Op. 33, sometimes also stylised in Greek capitals as , is a composition for orchestra by Hungarian composer György Kurtág. It was completed in 1994.

Composition 

The composition was first conceived as a work for piano in 1993, which was dedicated to András Mihály. Kurtág completed the orchestral score as a commission of the Berlin Philharmonic in 1994, while he was the composer-in-residence for the orchestra. The piece was premiered in Berlin, on 14 December 1994, by the Berlin Philharmonic under Claudio Abbado, both of these being the dedicatees. It was published later in 2003 by Editio Musica Budapest.

Music 

Stele is in three movements and takes up to thirteen minutes to perform. The three movements are untitled and are usually referenced by their tempo. All of the movements are meant to be played attacca. The movements are:

The final version of the score also includes a 2006 addition to the ending of the score which changes the last bar of the last movement and adds four more bars, extending the last notes played by the instruments. So far, both endings are accepted, even though the first one is still recorded more frequently.

Instrumentation 
The work is scored for a very large orchestra.

Woodwinds
 4 flutes
 1 alto flute
 1 bass flute
 3 oboes
 1 English horn
 4 clarinets in B
 1 bass clarinet in B
 1 contrabass clarinet in B
 3 bassoons
 1 contrabassoon

Brass
 4 French horns
 2 tenor tubas in B
 2 bass tubas in F
 4 trumpets in C
 4 trombones
 1 contrabass tuba

Keyboard instruments
 1 cimbalom
 2 harps
 1 celesta
 1 grand piano
 1 upright piano
 1 marimba
 1 vibraphone

Percussion (4 players)
 1 triangle (piccolo)
 5 cymbals
 1 tam-tam
 2 bongos
 2 log drums
 2 bass drums
 1 snare drum
 1 tambourine
 1 whip
 bells (C, F, A)

 timpani

Strings
 16 violin I
 14 violin II
 14 viola
 12 cellos
 12 double basses

Recordings 
 In December 1994, the dedicatees Claudio Abbado and the Berlin Philharmonic recorded the piece under Deutsche Grammophon. It was recorded at Berlin's Großer Saal of the Philharmonie.
 On 26 November 1996, the Southwest German Radio Symphony Orchestra recorded the piece with Michael Gielen with the RCA. The recording took place in the Konzerthaus Freiburg. This recording was later reissued by Hänssler.

Notes

References 

1994 compositions
Compositions for orchestra
Compositions by György Kurtág
Contemporary classical compositions

Compositions that use extended techniques